The Crescenta Valley flood occurred in New Year's Eve 1933 (December 31, 1933) and extended to New Year's 1934 (January 1, 1934) in the Crescenta Valley in Los Angeles County, California, inundating communities in the valley including La Crescenta-Montrose, La Cañada, and Tujunga.  This seemed to have happened because in late 1933, wildfires burned much of the trees and grass in the Crescenta Valley, leaving the cities in the lower parts of the valley vulnerable to flooding. On New Year's Eve, heavy rains led to the collapse of earthen dams, which in turn led to the destruction of many homes in the valley and many deaths.

Background 
In November 1933, wildfires raged through the nearby San Gabriel mountains above the communities of La Crescenta, La Cañada and Montrose. Earthen dams had been created by the Civilian Conservation Core in three of the valleys (Dunsmore, Pickens and Hall-Beckley) to trap rainwater. On New Year's Eve, more heavy rains led to sporadic flooding.

New Year's 

Around midnight on December 31 (1933), the earthen dams above the Crescenta Valley collapsed, sending millions of tons of mud and debris into the neighborhoods below. The mudslides that began in the mountains above La Cañada and La Crescenta carved a path of destruction all the way to the Verdugo Wash and beyond.

Aftermath 
Some Montrose residents sought shelter from flooding at American Legion Post 288, which was destroyed, killing 12.

More than 400 homes were destroyed in La Cañada, La Crescenta, Montrose and Tujunga. Scores of people were killed, and hundreds were left homeless. Entire families were wiped out.  Parts of Foothill Boulevard were buried under  of mud, boulders and debris. The mud was deep enough to bury cars completely on Montrose Avenue. Miles of Honolulu Boulevard were inundated by several feet of sand and silt.

Two notable victims of the flood were silent-era identical-twin child actors Winston and Weston Doty, who died at the age of 19.

Reconstruction 

Following the disaster, the U.S. Army Corps of Engineers and the County of Los Angeles (with the Los Angeles County Department of Public Works) built a flood control system of catch basins and concrete storm drains, designed to prevent a repeat of the 1933-1934 disaster.

The flood was commemorated in Woody Guthrie's song "Los Angeles New Year's Flood". To honor the victims of that New Year's calamity and to mark its 75th anniversary, a small monument was dedicated January 1, 2004, at Rosemont and Fairway avenues in Montrose, near where the American Legion Hall had stood.

References 

1933 floods in the United States
1934 floods in the United States
1933 in California
1934 in California
1933 natural disasters in the United States
1934 natural disasters in the United States
January 1934 events
December 1933 events
20th century in Los Angeles County, California
Crescenta Valley
Floods in California
Natural disasters in California
History of California